= Prestegjeld =

Geographic and administrative area within the Church of Norway

A prestegjeld was a geographic and administrative area within the Church of Norway (Den Norske Kirke) roughly equivalent to a parish. This traditional designation was in use for centuries to divide the kingdom into ecclesiastical areas that were led by a parish priest. Prestegjelds began in the 1400s and were officially discontinued in 2012.

== History ==
Prior to the discontinuation of the prestegjeld, Norway was geographically divided into 11 dioceses (bispedømme). Each diocese was further divided into deaneries (prosti). Each of those deaneries were divided into several parishes (prestegjeld). Each parish was made up of one or more sub-parishes or congregations (sogn or sokn). Within a prestegjeld, there were usually one or more clerical positions (chaplains) serving under the administration of a head minister (sogneprest or sokneprest). In 1838, the formannskapsdistrikt law was passed in Norway and it created civil municipalities that corresponded to the same borders as the ecclesiastical prestegjelds. Prior to that time there was no local government in Norway apart from the church's parishes. Today's municipalities have changed some, but their roots are all based on the prestegjeld.

Historically, the government employed all the priests working in all of the prestegjelds across Norway. In 1989, the law was changed so that each diocese employed the priests within its areas. Between 2004 and 2012, the prestegjeld was phased out of the Church of Norway. The new structure replaced the prestegjeld with the already-existing deanery (prosti). The sokn (sub-parishes or congregations) are the basic units of the church and all of the sokn within each municipality in Norway forms a governing church council for the municipality. The municipal church councils are part of a deanery and the deaneries are part of a diocese. Also in this reform, priests are now employed by the deaneries.
